Paul Kivel is an American writer, educator, and activist.  Kivel co-founded the Oakland Men's Project, a community education center focused on preventing male violence, and has been called "an innovative leader in violence prevention." Kivel is Jewish.

For most of his career, Kivel has focused on writing, education programs, and training programs designed to prevent male violence and youth violence, combat discrimination, and promote social justice and gender equality.  He has also founded the Challenging Christian Hegemony Project, which aims to combat the Christian values and belief which Kivel claims "dominate all aspects of our society through the social, political, economic, and cultural power they wield."

Bibliography
Uprooting Racism: How White People Can Work for Racial Justice (New Society Publishers; 1st edition, 1996; 4th rev. edition, 2017)
Making the Peace: A 15-session Violence Prevention Curriculum for Young People (with Allan Creighton, Oakland Men's Project, 1997)
You Call this a Democracy?: Who Benefits, who Pays and who Really Decides? (Apex Press, 2004)
Men's Work: How to Stop the Violence That Tears Our Lives Apart (Hazelden Publishing, 2010)

References

External links
 Challenging Christian Hegemony (homepage)
 Celebrating the Oakland Men's Project (California Coalition Against Sexual Assault)
 Biography of Kivil (New Society Publishers)

20th-century American non-fiction writers
21st-century American non-fiction writers
20th-century American male writers
Jewish American writers
Jewish anti-racism activists
Anti-domestic violence activists
Activists from the San Francisco Bay Area
Writers from Oakland, California
Year of birth missing (living people)
Date of birth missing (living people)
Living people
21st-century American male writers
21st-century American Jews